The Professional Futsal League is a planned professional futsal league in the United States.  The league was founded in 2016 and it was intended to begin play in 2018.

History
In February 2016, Mark Cuban purchased a principal ownership stake in the PFL. In an attempt to build support for the league, the PFL announced an All-Star Game to be played on August 4, 2016 in Orlando. On August 17, 2019, the PFL International Challenge was held at Allen Event Center in Allen, Texas, featuring the FC Barcelona Futsal under-23 team, Dallas Sidekicks, Team USA and Team Australia.

References

External links
 Official website

2015 establishments in the United States
Futsal leagues in the United States
Sports leagues established in 2015
Professional sports leagues in the United States